Sumi Tonooka (born October 3, 1956) is an American jazz pianist and composer.

Life 
She had an African-American father and a Japanese-American mother. She earned her B.A, in music from the Philadelphia College of Performing Arts.

Throughout her career, Tonooka has worked as a jazz pianist with musicians such as Kenny Burrell, Little Jimmy Scott, Sonny Fortune, Red Rodney, Benny Golson, Erica Lindsay, Odean Pope, Philly Joe Jones, Bobby Zankel and David Fathead Newman.

In 1985, Tonooka was commissioned by the Japanese American Cultural Association to write a piece based on the experiences of her mother, who was interned at Manzanar. This work, Out from the Silence, incorporates koto and shakuhachi instruments alongside standard jazz instrumentation. The work was used in the soundtrack for the film Susumu in 1991.

In addition to her activities as a musician she has contributed as a composer for numerous film scores such as the documentary Queen of the Mountain (2005). She has also taught piano at Bard College and at Dutchess Community College in the Hudson Valley of New York and worked as an assistant to Kenny Barron at Rutgers University.

Discography
With An Open Heart (with Rufus Reid, Akira Tana) (Radiant Records, 1990)
Taking Time (with Craig Handy, Rufus Reid, Akira Tana) (Candid Records, 1991)
Here Comes Kai (with Rufus Reid, Lewis Nash) (Candid Records, 1992)
Secret Places (with Rufus Reid, Lewis Nash) (Joken Records, 1998)
Kindred Spirits (with John Blake Jr.) (Spirit Records, 2000)
Long Ago Today (with Rufus Reid, Bob Braye) (Artists Recording Collective, 2005)
Initiation (with Erica Lindsay, Rufus Reid, Bob Braye) (Artists Recording Collective, 2009)
Now (Solo Live at the Howland) (Artists Recording Collective, 2012)

References

External links
 

1956 births
Living people
American jazz pianists
Women jazz pianists
American film score composers
Bard College faculty
University of the Arts (Philadelphia) alumni